Sadamitsu may refer to:

Places
 Sadamitsu, Tokushima, A former town in Tokushima, Japan. Now part of the town of Tsurugi, Tokushima
 Sadamitsu Station, A station in Tsurugi, Tokushima.

People
 Suganuma Sadamitsu, A Japanese samurai from Sengoku Era.
 Usui Sadamitsu, A Japanese warrior from the Mid-Heian Period.

Modern fictional characters
 Usui Sadamitsu, young female-warrior character in 2000s Otogizoshi (anime)
 Usui Sadamitsu, female-warrior character in Otogi 2: Immortal Warriors  game

Arts
 Sadamitsu the Destroyer, A manga series by Masahiko Nakahira.

Japanese masculine given names